Events from the year 1817 in Ireland.

Events
26 May – completion of Royal Canal throughout from Dublin to the River Shannon at Tarmonbarry.
31 May – first stone of new pier at the port of Dunleary is laid.
16 June – Poor Law Employment Act empowers the Lord Lieutenant to appoint commissioners of public works to supervise construction of public works to relieve unemployment financed by mortgages of rates.
17 June – first stone of Wellington Testimonial, Dublin, is laid in Phoenix Park.
11 July – an act to provide for the establishment of asylums for the lunatic poor in Ireland.
c. July – tradesman Jeffery Sedwards establishes the Skibbereen Abstinence Society, considered the first organisation devoted to teetotalism in Europe.
7 August – first stone of Wellington Column is laid in Trim, County Meath.
30 September – national fever committee appointed to distribute government relief to victims of the typhus epidemic (October 1816–December 1819).
Edward O'Reilly's Irish-English Dictionary is published.

Arts and literature
19 April – Charles Wolfe's poem The Burial of Sir John Moore at Corunna is first published in the Newry Telegraph.
27 May – Thomas Moore's poem Lalla-Rookh: an Oriental romance is first published in London.
June – Maria Edgeworth's novel Ormond: a tale is first published in London together with Harrington.

Births
6 January – J. J. McCarthy, architect (died 1882).
10 March – Patrick Neeson Lynch, bishop of the Roman Catholic Diocese of Charleston (South Carolina) (died 1882 in the United States).
26 May – Denis Florence MacCarthy, poet, translator and biographer (died 1882).
3 June – Robert Warren, lawyer and politician (died 1897).
12 July – William Henry Gregory, politician and writer (died 1892).
26 August – John Willoughby Crawford, politician and third Lieutenant Governor of Ontario (died 1875 in Canada).
19 September – Charles Joseph Alleyn, lawyer and political figure in Quebec (died 1890 in Canada).
11 October – Walter Shanly, civil engineer, author, businessman and politician in Canada (died 1899 in Canada).
12 November – John T. Mills, lawyer and Supreme Court Justice for the Republic of Texas (died 1871 in the United States).
22 November – Sir William Ewart, 1st Baronet, manufacturer and politician (died 1889).
7 December – William Keogh, lawyer and politician (died 1878).
12 December – Patrick Talbot, British Army officer (died 1898)
Full date unknown
James Anthony Lawson, lawyer (died 1887).
Frederick McCoy, palaeontologist and museum administrator in Australia (died 1899 in Australia).
Arthur McQuade, farmer and politician in Ontario (died 1884 in Canada).

Deaths
23 May – John Prendergast Smyth, 1st Viscount Gort, politician (born 1742).
13 June – Richard Lovell Edgeworth, politician, writer and inventor (born 1744).
5 September – Charles Osborne, lawyer and politician (born 1759).
14 October – John Philpot Curran, orator and wit, lawyer and MP (born 1750).
13 November – John Keogh, merchant and political activist (born 1740).

References

 
Years of the 19th century in Ireland
1810s in Ireland
Ireland
 Ireland